Åge Sørensen (18 May 1937 – 18 March 2022) was a Norwegian footballer who played as a forward. He made four appearances for the Norway national team from 1959 to 1961.

References

External links
 

1937 births
2022 deaths
Norwegian footballers
Footballers from Oslo
Association football forwards
Norway international footballers
Norway under-21 international footballers
Norway youth international footballers
Vålerenga Fotball players